Peter Chitila (born 8 September 1971) is a Zambian footballer. He played in ten matches for the Zambia national football team from 1997 to 2000. He was also named in Zambia's squad for the 1998 African Cup of Nations tournament.

References

External links
 
 

1971 births
Living people
Zambian footballers
Zambia international footballers
1998 African Cup of Nations players
Place of birth missing (living people)
Association football defenders
Power Dynamos F.C. players
Zanaco F.C. players